West of Zanzibar is a 1928 American silent film directed by Tod Browning. The screenplay concerns a vengeful stage magician named Phroso (Lon Chaney) who becomes paralyzed in a brawl with a rival (Lionel Barrymore). The supporting cast includes Mary Nolan and Warner Baxter. The screenplay was written by Elliott Clawson, based on a play named Kongo by Charles de Vonde and Kilbourn Gordon. Walter Huston starred in the stage play and later played Phroso again in the 1932 sound film remake of the same story which was also called Kongo.

The Hays office, the official Hollywood censor, banned the stage play "Kongo" from the screen, so to bypass the ruling, MGM changed the title first to SOUTH OF THE EQUATOR, then finally to WEST OF ZANZIBAR. Owen Moore was originally set to play Doc, but the role went to Warner Baxter instead. Mary Nolan was hired to play Maizie because she had "such sad eyes". Cedric Gibbons and Richard Day designed the sets, and David Cox handled the costumes.

West of Zanzibar is intriguing to Lon Chaney fans because of the lost or excised sequences that Browning allegedly shot for the film that no longer exist; in particular, Phroso (Chaney) in costume as The Human Duck in a freak show act and scenes showing Phroso and his troupe when they first arrive in Africa. Stills of Chaney in the duck costume exist, but it is unclear whether the scene was actually shot, or merely planned and publicity stills were taken.

The film was in production from June 25, 1928 to July 31, 1928, and cost $249,000 to produce. Its worldwide box office gross was $921,000. The film was released both silent and with sound effects and a synchronized music score.

Film historian Jon C. Mirsalis wrote that Waldemar Young was involved in writing the screenplay (but no other sources mention him) and that the film was released on December 28, 1928 instead of November 24th. Stills exist showing Chaney as the crippled Phroso..

The film is today readily available on DVD. MGM Home Video released it with the synchronized music score on laser disc in 1993. The film also turns up frequently on the Turner Classics Movies cable TV channel and on PBS stations. Print exists in the George Eastman Museum film archive [35mm positive].

Plot
Anna (Jacqueline Gadsden) cannot bring herself to tell her professional magician husband, The Great Phroso (Lon Chaney), that she is leaving him. Her lover, an ivory trader named Crane (Lionel Barrymore), informs Phroso that he is taking Anna away with him to Africa, and when an argument ensues, Crane pushes the distraught husband away from him so forcefully that he falls over a railing and is crippled, losing the use of his legs.

After leaving the hospital, Phroso learns to get around the neighborhood by propelling himself on a small wooden platform. After a year, he learns that Anna has returned from Africa apparently because Crane tired of her and threw her out. He finds his wife dead from starvation in a church, with a baby beside her. He swears to avenge himself on both Crane and the child. He adopts the child and moves to Africa with her.

Eighteen years later, Phroso (nicknamed "Dead-Legs" Flint) rules over a small outpost inhabited by "Doc" (Warner Baxter), Babe (Kalla Pasha), Tiny (Tiny Ward) and a native named Bumbu (Curtis Nero) in the depths of the African jungle. Through his magic tricks, Phroso dominates the local natives who call him the "White Voodoo". He has his men steal ivory repeatedly from Crane by having Tiny dress up as an evil voodoo spirit to frighten away Crane's black porters. Meanwhile, Phroso sends Babe to bring back a blonde prostitue named Maizie (Mary Nolan) from the "lowest dive in Zanzibar", where for years Phroso has had her raised. She is told only that she will finally get to meet her father.

When she arrives, Phroso denies being Maisie's father (to her great relief), but refuses to tell her why she has been brought there and treats her with undisguised hatred. The first night, she witnesses a gruesome tribal custom: when a man dies, his wife or daughter is burned alive on the same funeral pyre. As the days go by, Maizie gradually wins the perpetually drunk Doc's heart. However, Phroso purposely turns her into an alcoholic.

Phroso then sends word to Crane where he can find the people who are robbing his ivory. When Crane shows up and sees Maizie, Phroso tells him that Maizie is his daughter. To Phroso's surprise, Crane breaks out in laughter. He informs Phroso that Anna never went with him to Africa because she hated him for paralyzing her husband. Maizie is actually Phroso's child! Before he can absorb the news, the next step of his plan unfolds; the natives shoot and kill Crane. Now that Crane has been killed, custom demands that his daughter Maisie be burned with him on his funeral pyre.

Realizing now that she is actually his daughter, Phroso uses a magic trick to try to save Maisie from being burned alive. With the natives watching, he puts her in an upright wooden coffin with a secret exit in the back and closes the lid. When he reopens it, there is nothing but a skeleton inside. Meanwhile, Doc, Maizie and the others flee down to the river and escape by boat. However, the natives do not believe Phroso's claim that an evil spirit has taken Maizie; they realize he has tricked them. The screen fades to black as the natives close in on Phroso. Later, a native fishes a medallion out of the ashes of the funeral pyre, the same medallion that had hung around Phroso's neck.

Cast
Lon Chaney as Phroso ("Dead-Legs" Flint)
Lionel Barrymore as Crane
Mary Nolan as Maizie
Warner Baxter as Doc
Jacqueline Gadsden as Anna (as "Jane Daly")
Tiny Ward as Tiny
Kalla Pasha as Babe
Curtis Nero as Bumbu
Rose Dione as Zanzibar Club Owner (uncredited) 
Louise Emmons as Old Woman on Street (uncredited) 
Fred Gamble as Vaudeville Comedian (uncredited) 
Dick Sutherland as Cannibal (uncredited) 
Edna Tichenor as Dancing Girl in Zanzibar Club (scene cut from film) 
 Dan Wolheim as Man in Bar (scene cut from film)
Zalla Zarana as Woman in Zanzibar Bar (uncredited)
 Emmett King as Stage Manager
 Chaz Chase as Stage Performer
 Art Winkler as Phroso's assistant
 Mae Busch
 Richard Cummings
 Ida May

Reception
The motion picture trade journal Harrison's Reports warned its readers: "If you run West of Zanzibar, you will run it at the peril of alienating many of your regular customers. What mother will allow her young daughter to set foot into your theatre again?.... The stupidity of producers seems to be unbounded. They know that 95 per cent of the people of the United States do not want such trash as they have been putting out. And yet they insist on putting it out....How any normal person could have thought this horrible syphilitic play could have made an entertaining picture, even with Lon Chaney, who appears in gruesome and repulsive stories, is beyond comprehension. Demand that it be taken off your contract!" Despite this, the film proved to be a success, both domestically and internationally, although it had censorship problems in the British colony of Tanganyika for its portrayal of Africans.

After the film's premiere, the trade journal Motion Picture News advised: "If you do not have a Standing Room Only sign in your theatre, you had better order one immediately before playing this picture."

"Lon Chaney has gone cripple again for the sake of the public, but not for art's sake.....it seems a great pity that such a good actor should indulge in charlatan tricks." ---Photoplay

"Lon Chaney is back at his old gruesome habits. This time he's a thing that crawls, dragging himself around on the palms of his hands with his useless legs behind him. And very convincing too...This is a mad, weird grotesque and completely nutty melodrama."---Motion Picture Magazine

"With Lon Chaney in the principal role the picture is certain to be a box office drawing card, but there is nothing about the film itself that will cause anyone to go out and rave about it." ---Motion Picture News

"WEST OF ZANZIBAR indicates an over-worked Chaney. The star is there, but the rush of getting his quota on the release schedule is taking its toll in the most important phase of production--preparation. In this respect Chaney's latest impresses as having exhausted the property men and the casting director and allowing Tod Browning to follow religiously one of those cuff scripts...Musical score is regular. Attempts at sound effects are worse, the chanting of savages reproducing like a college boy chorus." ---Variety

"In a grim, ingenious, but somewhat artificial tale, with a background of an African swamp festooned with cannibals, Lon Chaney once again returns to the impersonation of a cripple...It is a well concocted narrative and Mr. Chaney gives one of  his most able and effective portrayals as he drags himself through scene after scene without using his legs." ---New York Times

In a much more recent review, Dennis Schwartz described it as a "strangely curious relic", but praised the "virtuoso performance of Chaney".

References

External links

 
West of Zanzibar at the silentera.com database

1928 films
1928 drama films
Silent American drama films
American silent feature films
American black-and-white films
1920s English-language films
Films about magic and magicians
American films about revenge
American films based on plays
Films directed by Tod Browning
Films set in Tanzania
Metro-Goldwyn-Mayer films
1920s American films